Pathanamthitta is a town in Kerala, India.

Pathanamthitta may also refer to:
 Pathanamthitta district, a district in Kerala
 Pathanamthitta (Lok Sabha constituency), a constituency in Kerala